East Otago High School is a secondary school in Palmerston, Otago, New Zealand. The school hosted a cultural exchange with Japanese pupils from Nichidai Third Junior High School between 2005 and 2008. They won the 2009 Otago Daily Times Extra spelling Quiz for Year 9 and 10.

History
East Otago High School traces its origins to 1865, with the establishment of Palmerston School. In 1885, Palmerston District High School was established, and in 1969, the school demerged to become Palmerston School and East Otago High School.

References 

Educational institutions established in 1885
Secondary schools in Otago
1885 establishments in New Zealand